Pogozhya Balka is a rural locality (a khutor) in Nezhinskoye Rural Settlement, Olkhovsky District, Volgograd Oblast, Russia. The population was 157 as of 2010. There are 2 streets.

Geography 
Pogozhya Balka is located in steppe, on the Volga Upland, 28 km northwest of Olkhovka (the district's administrative centre) by road. Nezhinsky is the nearest rural locality.

References 

Rural localities in Olkhovsky District